Judges of the Supreme Court of the Australian Capital Territory , including Chief Justices, Judges, Acting Judges, Additional Judges and Masters / Associate Justices.

Notes

References

Judges
 
Australian Capital Territory
Supreme Court of Australian Capital Territory